New Blood Interactive is a video game publisher. Founded by Aaron Alexander, Kreyg DeZago, and Dave Oshry in 2014, the company originally developed virtual reality games that were never released. In 2016, New Blood turned to publishing, first releasing Nick Clinkscales's Super Galaxy Squadron and finding early success with David Szymanski's Dusk.

History 
New Blood Interactive was founded in 2014 by lead designer Aaron Alexander, lead programmer Kreyg DeZago, and chief executive officer Dave Oshry. Alexander and Oshry had previously collaborated on the 2013 remake of Rise of the Triad. The company initially aimed to develop virtual reality games, including a boxing game it wanted to present at the Game Developers Conference. However, these plans never materialized. Oshry later came into contact with Nick Clinkscales. At the time, New Blood was looking for a pixel artist and Clinkscales needed a publisher for his Kickstarter-backed game Super Galaxy Squadron, so they agreed that New Blood would publish the game and Clinkscales join the company in return. Super Galaxy Squadron was released in January 2015. It was remastered as Super Galaxy Squadron EX in February 2016, with the Super Galaxy Squadron EX Turbo version released in March 2017. When Oshry encountered David Szymanski, who knew Oshry had worked on the Rise of the Triad remake, Szymanski spontaneously decided to pitch his boomer shooter game Dusk. New Blood released the game into early access in January 2018, and its success gave the company long-time financial support. New Blood subsequently signed publishing agreements for further retro-style games, including Amid Evil and Faith: The Unholy Trinity. Towards the end of Dusks early-access phase, the company brought in Dillon Rogers to help complete the game, which was released in December 2018. As New Blood employees, Rogers and Szymanski commenced work on the stealth game Gloomwood. Oshry considered this the beginning of a new phase for the studio, turning from solely a publisher to also developing games internally.

Organization 
As of August 2022, New Blood has 25 employees. The company has a flat hierarchy with many developers helping out on other projects. Most planning is done via Discord. Oshry oversees all development teams and manages the internal quality assurance team, which routinely tests games during their development. Oshry supports trade unions in the video game industry.

Games published

Unreleased

References

External links 
 

Video game companies established in 2014
Video game development companies
Video game publishers